Gypsyamber D'Souza is an American epidemiologist. She is a professor of epidemiology at the Johns Hopkins Bloomberg School of Public Health. D'Souza researches infectious diseases (including HPV, HIV, and SARS-CoV-2), cancer prevention, and translational epidemiology. She is a principal investigator of the Multicenter AIDS Cohort Study / Women's Interagency HIV Study Combined Cohort Study (Mwccs.org).

Education 
D'Souza earned a B.A. from Swarthmore College in 1996 and a M.S. from University of Wisconsin–Madison in 1999. She completed a M.P.H. at University of Texas Health Science Center at Houston in 2001 and a Ph.D. at Johns Hopkins Bloomberg School of Public Health in 2007. Her dissertation was titled Oropharyngeal cancer attributable to human papillomavirus 16 (HPV16) infection.

Career and research 
D'Souza is a professor in the division of cancer epidemiology within the department of epidemiology at the Johns Hopkins Bloomberg School of Public Health. She is jointly affiliated in the division of global disease epidemiology and control within the department of international health and the Johns Hopkins School of Medicine.

D'Souza researches infectious diseases, behavioral risk management, and translational epidemiology. She is the lead of a HPV and related cancer research program that also investigates risk triage and risk communication. D'Souza is a principal investigator on the Multicenter AIDS Cohort Study (MACS) / Women's Interagency HIV Study (WIHS) Combined Cohort Study (MACS/WIHS-CSS), a collaborative research effort that aims to understand and reduce the impact of chronic health conditions—including heart, lung, blood, and sleep (HLBS) disorders—that affect people living with HIV.

References

External links 

 

Living people
Year of birth missing (living people)
Place of birth missing (living people)
Swarthmore College alumni
University of Wisconsin–Madison alumni
University of Texas Health Science Center at Houston alumni
Johns Hopkins Bloomberg School of Public Health alumni
Johns Hopkins Bloomberg School of Public Health faculty
American women epidemiologists
American epidemiologists
21st-century American women scientists
American medical researchers
Women medical researchers
HIV/AIDS researchers